Attica is an unincorporated community located in the town of Brooklyn, Green County, Wisconsin, United States.

History
Attica was the third name for the community, after Winneshiek and Milford. The local post office was named Attica after Attica, New York and the community later took the name.

Notable people
Romanzo E. Davis, Wisconsin State Senator
Frank A. Day, Lieutenant Governor of Minnesota

References

Unincorporated communities in Green County, Wisconsin
Unincorporated communities in Wisconsin